Åmmeberg is a locality situated in Askersund Municipality, Örebro County, Sweden with 590 inhabitants in 2010. It is situated at an estuary by a fjord of lake Vättern. It existed as early as the 12th century and had a mill owned by the convent in Riseberga. It was the regional centre of trade until the founding of Askersund.

The first Swedish female aviator, Elsa Andersson, died at age 24 outside Åmmeberg during a parachute jump 22 January 1922  (her third ever).

According to local tradition Queen Christina of Sweden was to confer upon Åmmeberg city privileges, but her carriage broke down in Askersund, and the queen who preferred not travel any further decided that Askersund was to have the city rights.

It was the port of the mining industry in Zinkgruvan, an industry started by a Belgian company Vieille Montagne 1857. The mine belongs to Lundin Mining since June 2004.

It is the summerhome of former Sweden's ambassador to Switzerland, the novelist Jan Mårtenson, and has a small harbour and a seaside-golf course.

Riksdag elections 
Åmmeberg is forming an electoral ward with nearby Zinkgruvan. While historically the area has been left-wing with an industrial and mining heritage, this has gradually been eroded in the 21st century, with the electoral ward going to the right-leaning parties for the first time in 2018.

References 

Populated lakeshore places in Sweden
Populated places in Örebro County
Populated places in Askersund Municipality